Innerarity Point is an unincorporated community in Escambia County, Florida, United States. It is part of the Pensacola–Ferry Pass–Brent Metropolitan Statistical Area. Innerarity Point is located north of Perdido Key.

Unincorporated communities in Escambia County, Florida
Pensacola metropolitan area
Unincorporated communities in Florida